Vetralla is a town and comune in the province of Viterbo, in central Italy,  south of that city, located on a shoulder of Monte Fogliano.

History
Vetralla's dominating fortified position in the heart of Etruscan territories has been continuously occupied since the Early Middle Ages. The Roman site, two kilometers distant, was a posting station on the Via Cassia; some ruins of walls and paving at S. Maria di Forcassi still mark the Roman Forum Cassii.  The site was depopulated in the later Empire, when a smaller population retreated to the present strategic position commanding the valley, where it remained exposed to attack, in spite of the imposing walls that encircled it.

The little fortress had been incorporated into the Papal States from their historic beginnings with the Lombard king Liutprand's Donation of Sutri (728) to Pope Gregory II, but the lords of Viterbo held it from 1110 to 1134. By 1145, Pope Eugene III was installed at Vetralla, safely removed from the violence and party strife of Rome; from here he issued his bull Quantum praedecessores, calling for the Second Crusade.

The territory was given extensive woodlands by Pope Innocent III in 1206, which brought it into fierce contention with the lords of Viterbo who coveted the land. To this day, in the annual ceremonial Sposalizio dell'albero ("marriage of the tree"), the mayor of Vetralla reaffirms the town's rights of possession on Monte Fogliano. The fief was entrusted through the centuries to various noble families associated with the Papacy, as lords of Vetralla: first the Orsini, then the Di Vico until 1435, when the last lord Giacomo di Vico was forcibly ousted by the cardinal-condottiere Giovanni Vitelleschi, confined in the fortress of Soriano, then beheaded. Vetralla then passed in rapid succession among a series of Papal nobles: to Cardinal Giovanni Borgia, to Lorenzo Cybo (1529), and to Cardinal Alessandro Farnese in 1534.

Uniquely among non-English cities, in 1512 Vetralla received the protection of the English Crown, bestowed upon the town by Henry VIII, and a monument commemorating this event can still be found in the local town hall.

Main sights
Church of San Pietro
Church of San Francesco
Church of Sant'Angelo
Grotta Porcina
Church of Santa Maria in Forocasii
City and Territory Museum
Rock necropolis of Norchia

Transportation
Vetralle is reached by the SS Cassia national road. The Aurelia bis road connects it to Tarquinia.

It has a station on the FR3 Rome-Capranica-Viterbo regional railroad.

See also
Monti Cimini

References

External links
Official website 
Info about and pictures of Vetralla's Living Nativity
Tuscia 360 about Vetralla with VR panoramas
SITE CITTADIVETRALLA

Cities and towns in Lazio